Motta de' Conti is a comune (municipality) in the Province of Vercelli in the Italian region Piedmont, located about  east of Turin and about  southeast of Vercelli.

Motta de' Conti borders the following municipalities: Candia Lomellina, Caresana, Casale Monferrato, Langosco, and Villanova Monferrato.

References

Cities and towns in Piedmont